L. darwinii may refer to:
 Lecocarpus darwinii, a flowering plant species found only in Galápagos Islands and Ecuador
 Leucosolenia darwinii
 Liolaemus darwinii, a lizard species in the genus Liolaemus

See also
 Darwinii (disambiguation)